Odra was a kingdom located in the northern Odisha in Eastern India. This kingdom was mentioned in the epic Mahabharata. Odras were neighbours to the Vangas. It is believed that the Odia language and the state Odisha got their names derived from the name "Odra".

Reference in Mahabharata 
Only a single reference of Odra is found in Mahabharata. The Odras were mentioned along with the Vangas, Angas and Paundras as bringing tribute for Yudhishthira for his Rajasuya sacrifice (3,51).

There is a mysterious mention of the name Udrakeralas in Mahabharata. It is not known if the word Udra in the composite word Udra-Keralas has any relations with Odra.

See also 
 Kingdoms of Ancient India

References 
 Mahabharata of Krishna Dwaipayana Vyasa, translated to English by Kisari Mohan Ganguli

External links

Kingdoms in the Mahabharata